Svenska Cupen 1942 was the second season of the main Swedish football Cup. The competition was concluded on 18 October 1942 with the Final, held at Råsunda Stadium, Solna in Stockholms län. GAIS won the final 2–1 against IF Elfsborg before an attendance of 10,013 spectators.

Preliminary round

For other results see SFS-Bolletinen - Matcher i Svenska Cupen.

First round

For other results see SFS-Bolletinen - Matcher i Svenska Cupen.

Second round
The 8 matches in this round were played on 10 and 12 July 1942.

Quarter-finals
The 4 matches in this round were played between 17 July and 19 July 1942.

Semi-finals
The semi-finals in this round were played on 23 August 1942.

Final
The final was played on 18 October 1942 at the Råsunda Stadium.

Footnotes

References 

1942
Cup
Sweden